"No More Tears" is a song by French house duo Modjo. It was released in January 2002 as the fourth single from their debut studio album, Modjo.

Track listings
"No More Tears" (radio edit)
"No More Tears" (Step/House Mix by Play Paul)
"No More Tears" (Wuz Remix By Alex Gopher)
"No More Tears" (album version)

Charts

References

2001 songs
2002 singles
Modjo songs
PolyGram singles
House music songs